Xyela is a genus of sawflies, belonging to the family Xyelidae.

The genus was described in 1819 by Dalman.

The genus has cosmopolitan distribution.

List of species

Subgenus Xyela
 Xyela alberta (Curran, 1923)
 Xyela altenhoferi Blank, 2013
 Xyela alpigena (Strobl, 1895)
 Xyela bakeri Konow, 1898
 Xyela brunneiceps Rohwer, 1913
 Xyela californica Rohwer, 1913
 Xyela cheloma Burdick, 1961
 Xyela concava Burdick, 1961
 Xyela curva Benson, 1938
 Xyela densiflorae Blank & Shinohara, 2005
 Xyela deserti Burdick, 1961
 Xyela dodgei Greenbaum, 1974
 Xyela exilicornis Maa, 1949
 Xyela fusca Blank, Kramp & Shinohara, 2017
 Xyela gallicaulis D.R. Smith, 1970
 Xyela graeca J.P.E.F. Stein, 1876
 Xyela heldreichii Blank, 2013
 Xyela helvetica (Benson, 1961)
 Xyela intrabilis MacGillivray, 1923
 Xyela japonica Rohwer, 1910
 Xyela julii (Brébisson, 1818)
 Xyela kamtshatica Gussakovskij, 1935
 Xyela koraiensis Blank & Shinohara, 2013
 Xyela linsleyi Burdick, 1961
 Xyela longula Dalman, 1819
 Xyela lugdunensis (Berland, 1943)
 Xyela lunata Burdick, 1961
 Xyela menelaus Benson, 1960
 Xyela meridionalis Shinohara, 1983
 Xyela middlekauffi Burdick, 1961
 Xyela minor Norton, 1869
 Xyela obscura (Strobl, 1895)
 Xyela occidentalis Blank & Shinohara, 2005
 Xyela par Blank & Shinohara, 2005
 Xyela peuce Blank, 2013
 Xyela pini Rohwer, 1913
 Xyela priceae Burdick, 1961
 Xyela pumilae Blank & Shinohara, 2013
 Xyela radiatae Burdick, 1961
 Xyela rasnitsyni Blank & Shinohara, 2013
 Xyela serrata Burdick, 1961
 Xyela sibiricae Blank, 2013
 Xyela sinicola Maa, 1947
 Xyela styrax Burdick, 1961
 Xyela tecta Blank & Shinohara, 2005
 Xyela uncinatae Blank, 2013
 Xyela ussuriensis Rasnitsyn, 1965
 Xyela variegata Rohwer, 1910
 †Xyela florissantensis Rasnitsyn, 1995
 †Xyela latipennis Statz, 1936
 †Xyela magna Statz, 1936
 †Xyela micrura Rasnitsyn, 1995
Subgenus Mesoxyela
 †Xyela mesozoica Rasnitsyn, 1965
Subgenus Pinicolites
 †Xyela graciosa (Meunier, 1920)
 †Xyela lata D.R. Smith, 1990

References

Sawflies
Sawfly genera
Taxa named by Johan Wilhelm Dalman